Slaves of the Shinar is a historical fantasy novel that was written by Justin Allen and published in 2006. The book explores the early lives and origins of characters and peoples to be found in Middle Eastern myths and religious texts, especially the Biblical Book of Genesis and the Epic of Gilgamesh. Included from Genesis are depictions of the Nephilim (called Niphilim in the book), Jared (grandfather of Methuselah), Lamech (father of Noah) and Adah (wife of Lamech). The name Shinar also comes from the book of Genesis, chapter ten. Likewise, from the Epic of Gilgamesh and related middle-eastern myths come such figures as Gilgamesh, Enkidu and the gods Marduk, Baal, and Moloch.

External links 
 Justin-Allen.com - Official Site
 Overlook Press 
 Seattle Times Review 
 Duckworth Publishers

2006 American novels
2006 fantasy novels
Works by Justin Allen
American fantasy novels
Cultural depictions of Gilgamesh
Novels set in the Ancient Near East
Works based on the Epic of Gilgamesh
Novels based on the Bible
The Overlook Press books